Argyrargenta is a monotypic moth genus of the family Noctuidae. Its only species, Argyrargenta giacomellii, is found in Argentina. Both the genus and species were first described by Emilio Berio in 1939.

References

Acontiinae
Monotypic moth genera